Roy Francis (20 January 1919 – April 1989) was a Welsh rugby union, and professional rugby league footballer and coach of the mid 20th century. He was the first Black British professional coach in any sport. A Great Britain and Wales national representative three-quarter back, he played for English clubs Wigan, Barrow, Dewsbury (World War II guest), Warrington and Hull F.C. Francis then became a coach with Hull F.C. Renowned for his innovative coaching methods, he was regarded as a visionary, leading Hull to title success before going on to win the Challenge Cup with Leeds. He then broke further ground by moving on to coach in Australia with the North Sydney Bears before another brief stint at Leeds, and then Bradford Northern.

Playing career
Francis came from Brynmawr, Wales. He played rugby union for Brynmawr RFC before joining English rugby league club Wigan as a seventeen-year-old
 on 14 November 1936. He made his début for Wigan on Friday 26 March 1937. He transferred from Wigan to Barrow in January 1939 but then served in the Army during the Second World War. He played rugby union in the Army and also made guest appearances for Dewsbury. Francis became a Sergeant in the British Army during World War II. Francis played as a left-, i.e. number 4 in Dewsbury's 14-25 aggregate defeat by Wigan in the Championship Final during the 1943–44 season; the 9-13 first-leg defeat at Central Park, Wigan on Saturday 13 May 1944, and scored a try in the 5-12 second-leg defeat at Crown Flatt, Dewsbury on Saturday 20 May 1944.

Returning to Barrow after the war, Francis represented Great Britain but was controversially overlooked for one Ashes tour to Australia for political reasons, the organisers fearing the ructions that could be caused by travelling to a country with an infamous bar on non-white people. He joined Warrington for £800 in July 1948. Roy Francis played in Warrington's 13–12 defeat by Huddersfield the Championship Final during the 1948–49 season at Maine Road, Manchester on Saturday 14 May 1949.

He transferred from Barrow to Hull during November 1949 for a fee of £1,250. Francis played his last game on Boxing Day 1955 before switching to coaching, a field in which he was to make an even greater impact.

Coaching career

Francis' man-management, coaching methods and use of psychological techniques were considered years ahead of their time. He was the first coach to embrace players' families and offer them transport to games.

Roy Francis was the coach in Hull FC's 13–30 defeat by Wigan in the 1959 Challenge Cup Final during the 1958–59 season at Wembley Stadium, London on Saturday 9 May 1959, in front of a crowd of 79,811, and was the coach in the 5–38 defeat by Wakefield Trinity in the 1960 Challenge Cup Final during the 1959–60 season at Wembley Stadium, London on Saturday 14 May 1960, in front of a crowd of 79,773.

Francis left Hull F.C. for Leeds in 1963 and oversaw their victory in the 1968 Challenge Cup 'Watersplash' Final during the 1967–68 season at Wembley.

Francis moved to Sydney to coach the North Sydney Bears for the 1969 NSWRFL season and stayed until 1970.

From 1971 to 1973 Francis was Hull FC's team manager. He won a Premiership title back at Leeds during the 1974–75 season, and then coached Bradford Northern from 1975.

He died in April 1989, aged 70.

Honours 
Francis served as a Sergeant in the British Army during World War II.

As a player 
  Championship Final runner-up: 1944

As a coach 
  Championship Winners: 1956, 1958, 1974
 Challenge Cup: 1968

References

External links
BBC article with video titled "Roy Francis: Rugby league's innovator, pioneer, star"
Rugby Cup Final 1968
Who was Roy Francis - YouTube 

1919 births
1989 deaths
Barrow Raiders players
Black British sportsmen
Bradford Bulls coaches
British Army personnel of World War II
British Army soldiers
Brynmawr RFC players
Dewsbury Rams players
Footballers who switched code
Great Britain national rugby league team players
Hull F.C. coaches
Hull F.C. players
Leeds Rhinos coaches
North Sydney Bears coaches
Northern Command XIII rugby league team players
Rugby union players from Cardiff
Rugby league players from Cardiff
Rugby league wingers
Wales national rugby league team players
Warrington Wolves players
Welsh rugby league coaches
Welsh rugby league players
Welsh rugby union players
Wigan Warriors players
Rugby articles needing expert attention